Norman Brookes won in the final 6–1, 6–2, 6–3 against Horace Rice to win the men's singles tennis title at the 1911 Australasian Championships.

Rodney Heath was the defending champion, but lost in the quarterfinals to Norman Brookes.

Draw

Finals

Top half

Bottom half

External links
 

 

Men's singles